Cornelis Ignatius Maria (Keje) Molenaar (born 29 September 1958 in Volendam) is a retired Dutch footballer who was active as a defender. Molenaar made his professional debut at FC Volendam and also played for Ajax Amsterdam, Feyenoord Rotterdam and SVV. He currently works as a lawyer for Dutch law firm 'Brada Abeln'

Honours
 1981-82 : Eredivisie winner with Ajax
 1982-83 : Eredivisie winner with Ajax
 1982-83 : KNVB Cup winner with Ajax
 First match: 18 September 1977 : FC Twente - FC Volendam, 1-0

References

 Profile

1958 births
Living people
Dutch footballers
Feyenoord players
AFC Ajax players
FC Volendam players
Netherlands international footballers
SV SVV players
Eredivisie players
Eerste Divisie players
People from Volendam
Association football defenders
Footballers from North Holland